Máel Ísu Mac in Baird (died 1173) was a Bishop of Clonfert.

Máel Ísu Mac in Baird was a native of Soghain, a territory in western Ui Maine (now part of County Galway). From about his lifetime or earlier, members of the Mac an Bhaird would become professional poets and historians. The surname is now generally rendered as Ward.

References

Sources
 The Surnames of Ireland, Edward MacLysaght, 1978.
 A New History of Ireland: Volume IX - Maps, Genealogies, Lists, ed. T.W. Moody, F.X. Martin, F.J. Byrne.

External links
 http://www.ucc.ie/celt/published/T100005C/
 http://www.ucc.ie/celt/published/G105007/index.html

People from County Galway
Medieval Gaels from Ireland
12th-century Roman Catholic bishops in Ireland
Bishops of Clonfert